Niekazanice is a village in the administrative district of Gmina Branice, within Głubczyce County, Opole Voivodeship, in southwest Poland, near the Czech border.

References

Niekazanice